The 1965 New Year Honours in New Zealand were appointments by Elizabeth II on the advice of the New Zealand government to various orders and honours to reward and highlight good works by New Zealanders. The awards celebrated the passing of 1964 and the beginning of 1965, and were announced on 1 January 1965.

The recipients of honours are displayed here as they were styled before their new honour.

Knight Bachelor
 Professor Edward George Sayers   – dean of the Medical Faculty, University of Otago.

Order of the Bath

Companion (CB)
Military division
 Air Vice-Marshal Ian Gordon Morrison  – Royal New Zealand Air Force.

Order of Saint Michael and Saint George

Companion (CMG)
 George Burns – of Christchurch. For services to journalism.
 John Thomson Gilkison – Commissioner of Works.

Order of the British Empire

Knight Commander (KBE)
Civil division
 William Alfred Stevenson  – of Auckland. For services to the community.

Commander (CBE)
Civil division
 William Henry Cooper – of Auckland. For services to education.
 Percy Dowse  – mayor of Hutt City. 
 Alister Murray Linton – mayor of Rotorua.
 Ernest Richard Toop  – of Wellington. For services to local government.

Military division
 Brigadier Robert Boyd Dawson  – New Zealand Regular Force.

Officer (OBE)
Civil division
 Arthur Dudley Carson – director of the Fields and Marginal Lands Divisions, Department of Lands and Survey.
 Bertie Victor Cooksley  – of Masterton. For services to the community.
 Donald Alexander Finlayson  – of Northland. For services to the dairy industry.
 Alexander Kirkpatrick  – of Hastings. For services to local government.
 Grant Raglan Milne – of Wellington. For services in the field of engineering, particularly as president of the New Zealand Institution of Engineers.
 Lawrence David Jose Nathan  – of Auckland. For services to the community in the fields of philanthropy and local government.
 Robert Steele Pearson – superintendent of the Youth Centre, Prisons Department, Waikeria.
 Morton Sommerville Rennie – of Auckland. For services to agriculture.
 Peter George Snell  – of Auckland. For his outstanding achievement in the field of athletics.
 Winifred Sarah Train – lately matron, Palmerston North Public Hospital.
 Frederick Turnovsky – of Wellington. For services in the field of music.

Military division
 Commander John Malcolm Fielder  – Royal New Zealand Naval Volunteer Reserve.
 Lieutenant-Colonel Noel Rodney Ingle  – Royal New Zealand Corps of Signals (Regular Force).
 Wing Commander Melville Harry Scott Innes-Jones – Royal New Zealand Air Force.

Member (MBE)
Civil division
 Victor Maxwell Anderson – of Eketāhuna. For services to local government.
 Edward Stuart Bibby  – of Waipawa. For services to the community.
 Ada Clark – of Auckland. For services to the Missions to Seamen Harbour Lights Guild.
 Cyril James Cox . For services to the community, especially as chairman of the Nelson Health Camp Committee.
 Leo Vernon Farthing  – of Timaru. For services to local government and welfare organisations.
 Hubert Menary Hammond – of Hamilton. For services to local government and horticulture.
 David Livingstone Holmes . For community welfare services, especially as chairman of the Chatham Islands County Council.
 Bruce Hutchen – of Taranaki. For services to the community.
 Laura May Cook Ingram  – of Motueka. For services in the fields of community welfare and local government.
 Herbert George Kemp  – of Ashburton. For services to local government and the community.
 Mabel Mahinarangi Kewene – matron, Te Puia Springs Hospital, Gisborne.
 Thomas McKenzie  – of Invercargill. For services to farming.
 Albert Henry Nees – of Blenheim. For services to local-body affairs.
 Edward Herbert Raymond  – mayor of Te Puke Borough Council.
 William John Richards – mayor of Hokitika.
 Te Kiato Riwai  –  of Christchurch. For services as a welfare officer to the Māori people.
 Martin Sydney Stanley Smith  – deputy mayor of Wanganui.
 Ernest Wilfred Turner  – of Auckland. For services to local government.

Military division
 Surgeon Lieutenant Commander Thomas Henry Logan – Royal New Zealand Navy.
 Warrant Officer Class I Jack Douglas Flowerday – Royal New Zealand Infantry Regiment (Regular Force).
 Major James Frederick Moodie   – Royal New Zealand Army Medical Corps (Regular Force).
 Squadron Leader Herbert Keele Horne – Royal New Zealand Air Force.
 Warrant Officer Laurie Alexander Anderson – Royal New Zealand Air Force.
 Warrant Officer Brian Elliott Nye – Royal New Zealand Air Force.

British Empire Medal (BEM)
Civil division, for gallantry 
 Andrew Robert McFarlane – constable, New Zealand Police. For arresting a mentally unbalanced man armed with a rifle.
 Donald Kinloch White – sergeant, New Zealand Police. For arresting a mentally unbalanced man armed with a rifle.

Civil division, for meritorious service
 James Gordon Mearns – station maintenance overseer, Ministry of Works Staff, Royal New Zealand Air Force Station Hobsonville.
 Hector Redvers Sear – chief guide, Waitomo Caves.
 Archibald Frederick Williams – group scoutmaster, 1st Karori Group.

Military division
 Chief Petty Officer Writer Frederick Cozens – Royal New Zealand Navy.
 Chief Petty Officer Electrician Michael John Patrick Headley – Royal New Zealand Navy.
 Chief Radio Electrical Artificer Peter George Saunders – Royal New Zealand Navy.
 Chief Petty Officer John Stokes – Royal New Zealand Navy.
 Sergeant John Lawrence Rogers Lydiate – Royal New Zealand Infantry Regiment (Territorial Force).
 Staff-Sergeant (temporary) John David Anson Wright – Royal New Zealand Artillery (Regular Force).
 Flight Sergeant Maurice Alan Conroy – Royal New Zealand Air Force.
 Flight Sergeant James Walter Findlay – Royal New Zealand Air Force.

Royal Red Cross

Associate (ARRC)
 Matron Iris Frazer – Royal New Zealand Nursing Corps (Regular Force).

Air Force Cross (AFC)
 Squadron Leader Edmund Chester Arundel – Royal New Zealand Air Force.
 Flight Lieutenant William Edmund Hugh Bromley – Royal New Zealand Air Force.

Queen's Fire Services Medal (QFSM)
 Leslie Roy Joseph Osmond – chief fire officer, Christchurch Fire Brigade.
 Hector Edward Braggins – lately third officer, Masterton Fire Brigade.

Queen's Police Medal (QPM)
 William Smith Craigie – assistant commissioner, New Zealand Police Force.
 Henry Mark Holmes – detective chief superintendent, New Zealand Police Force.

Queen's Commendation for Valuable Service in the Air
 Flying Officer Gerald Ayre – Royal New Zealand Air Force.

References

New Year Honours
1965 awards
1965 in New Zealand
New Zealand awards